William Barry may refer to:

Politics 
Dick Barry (1926–2013), Speaker of the Tennessee House of Representatives
William T. Barry (1784–1835), politician from Kentucky and Postmaster General under Andrew Jackson
William S. Barry (1821–1868), American politician from Mississippi
Bill Barry (politician) (1899–1972), member of the Victorian Legislative Assembly
William Bernard Barry (1902–1946), politician from New York

Religion 
William Francis Barry (1849–1930), British Catholic priest, theologian, educator and writer
William Barry (bishop) DD (1872–1929), Archbishop of Hobart, Tasmania
William Barry (Congregationalist) (1805–1885), American Congregational pastor and author

Sports 
Bill Barry (1899–1955), Australian rules footballer
William Barry (footballer) (1929–2007), Irish footballer
William L. Barry (born 1940), British rower and coach

Other 
William Gerard Barry (1864–1941), Irish artist
William R. Barry (c. 1827–1900), American businessman and advocate for the deaf
William J. Barry (born 1943), Irish phonetician
William Farquhar Barry (1818–1879), U.S. Army officer in the Mexican–American and American Civil wars
William Jackson Barry (1819–1907), New Zealand adventurer and writer

See also
 William Parry (disambiguation)